South East Stars are a women's cricket team that represent the London & South East region, one of eight regional hubs in English domestic women's cricket. They play their home matches at various grounds, including the County Cricket Ground, Beckenham. They are captained by Bryony Smith and coached by Johann Myburgh. The team carries over many elements of the WCSL team Surrey Stars, but are now partnered with both Surrey and Kent. The team won the inaugural Charlotte Edwards Cup, beating Northern Diamonds in the final.

History
In 2020, women's cricket in England was restructured, creating eight new 'regional hub' teams, with the intention of playing both 50-over and 20-over cricket. South East Stars were one of the sides created under this structure, effectively replacing the Women's Cricket Super League team Surrey Stars and representing the London & South East region, partnering with Surrey and Kent. The side was to be captained by Tash Farrant and coached by Jonathan Batty. Due to the COVID-19 pandemic, the 2020 season was truncated, and only 50-over cricket was played, in the Rachael Heyhoe Flint Trophy. South East Stars finished third in the South Group of the competition, winning two of their six matches. At the end of the season, five Stars players were given full-time domestic contracts, the first of their kind in England: Tash Farrant, Alice Davidson-Richards, Sophia Dunkley, Bryony Smith and Aylish Cranstone.

The following season, 2021, South East Stars competed in both the Rachael Heyhoe Flint Trophy and the newly formed Twenty20 competition, the Charlotte Edwards Cup. Johann Myburgh was named as the new Head Coach of the side. In the Rachael Heyhoe Flint Trophy, the side finished fifth in the group of eight, winning three of their seven matches, including scoring the highest team score of the tournament in the opening match, 324/7 against Sunrisers. In the Charlotte Edwards Cup, the Stars topped Group A of the tournament, winning five of their six matches to progress directly to the final. In the final, they played against Northern Diamonds. Chasing 139 to win, South East Stars won by 5 wickets with 2 overs to spare, with Alice Capsey top scoring with 40*. Bryony Smith, who captained the side throughout most of the tournament whilst Tash Farrant was on international duty, ended the tournament as the leading wicket-taker, with 14 wickets. Smith became the permanent captain of the side ahead of the 2022 season. The team qualified for the semi-final of the Charlotte Edwards Cup that season after topping Group A with five wins from six matches, but lost by 2 wickets to Central Sparks. They finished second in the group stage of the Rachael Heyhoe Flint Trophy, qualifying for the play-off. In the play-off, they lost to Southern Vipers by 6 wickets.

Home grounds

Players

Current squad
As per 2022 season.
 No. denotes the player's squad number, as worn on the back of their shirt.
  denotes players with international caps.

Academy
The South East Stars Academy team plays against other regional academies in friendly and festival matches across various formats. The academy selects players from across the South East region, and includes some players who are also in the first team squad. Players in the 2022/23 Academy are listed below:

Overseas players
  Lauren Smith – Australia (2022)

Coaching staff

 Head Coach: Johann Myburgh
 Regional Director: Richard Bedbrook
 Senior Regional Talent Manager: Tom Lister
 Physiotherapist: Saajan Shah
 Strength & Conditioning Coach: Guy Pitchers
 Team Operations Executive: Lettie Hadley

As of the 2022 season.

Seasons

Rachael Heyhoe Flint Trophy

Charlotte Edwards Cup

Statistics

Rachael Heyhoe Flint Trophy

 Abandoned matches are counted as NR (no result)
 Win or loss by super over or boundary count are counted as tied.

Charlotte Edwards Cup

 Abandoned matches are counted as NR (no result)
 Win or loss by super over or boundary count are counted as tied.

Records

Rachael Heyhoe Flint Trophy
Highest team total: 324/7, v Sunrisers on 29 May 2021.
Lowest (completed) team total: 98 v Southern Vipers on 5 September 2020.
Highest individual score: 114, Bryony Smith v Lightning on 17 September 2022.
Best individual bowling analysis: 5/33, Tash Farrant v Sunrisers on 29 May 2021.
Most runs: 495 runs in 13 matches, Bryony Smith.
Most wickets: 21 wickets in 13 matches, Bryony Smith.

Charlotte Edwards Cup
Highest team total: 183/9, v Sunrisers on 5 June 2022.
Lowest (completed) team total: 104/8, v Central Sparks on 11 June 2022.
Highest individual score: 66*, Aylish Cranstone v Western Storm on 21 May 2022.
Best individual bowling analysis: 4/14, Bryony Smith v Central Sparks on 11 June 2022.
Most runs: 311 runs in 14 matches, Bryony Smith.
Most wickets: 25 wickets in 14 matches, Bryony Smith.

Honours
 Charlotte Edwards Cup:
 Champions (1) – 2021

See also
 Kent Women cricket team
 Surrey Women cricket team
 Surrey Stars

References

 
2020 establishments in England
Cricket in London
Surrey County Cricket Club
Kent County Cricket Club
Cricket in Surrey
Cricket in Kent
Cricket clubs established in 2020
English Domestic Women's Cricket Regional Hub teams